The Zilog eZ80 is an 8-bit microprocessor from Zilog, introduced in 2001. eZ80 is an updated version of the company's first product, the Z80 microprocessor.

Design 

The eZ80 (like the Z380) is binary compatible with the Z80 and Z180, but almost three times as fast as the original Z80 chip at the same clock frequency. The eZ80 has a three-stage pipeline. Available at up to 50 MHz (2004), the performance is comparable to a Z80 clocked at 150 MHz if fast memory is used (i.e. no wait states for opcode fetches, for data, or for I/O) or even higher in some applications (a 16-bit addition is 11 times as fast as in the original). The eZ80 also supports direct continuous addressing of 16 MB of memory without a memory management unit, by extending most registers (HL, BC, DE, IX, IY, SP, and PC) from 16 to 24 bits. In order to do so, the CPU has a full 24-bit address mode called ADL mode. Z80 register pairs are extended to 24 bits and renamed with U e.g. HL is now HLU etc. But it can still work in the original Z80-compatible mode.

The processor has a 24-bit ALU arithmetic logic unit and overlapped processing of several instructions (the three-stage pipeline) which are the two primary reasons for its speed. Unlike the older Z280 and Z380 it does not have (or need) a cache memory. Instead, it is intended to work with fast SRAM directly as main memory (as this had become much cheaper). Nor does it have the multiplexed bus of the Z280, making it as easy to work with (interface to) as the original Z80 and Z180, and equally predictable when it comes to exact execution times.

The chip has a memory interface that is similar to the original Z80, including the bus request/acknowledge pins, and adds four integrated chip selects. Versions are available with on-chip flash memory and on-chip zero wait-state SRAM (up to 256 KB flash memory and 16 KB SRAM) but there are also external buses on all models.

Variants 

eZ80Acclaim! is a family of eZ80 single chip computers labeled as "application-specific standard products" (ASSP) that feature up to 128 KB of flash memory, up to 8 KB of SRAM, and can operate at speeds of up to 20 MHz. Like other eZ80 variants, it has an external address and data bus and can thus be used as a general purpose microprocessor as well.

eZ80AcclaimPlus! is a family of connectivity ASSPs that feature up to 256 KB of flash memory, 16 KB of SRAM, can operate at speeds of up to 50 MHz. It adds an integrated 10/100BaseT Ethernet MAC, TCP/IP stack over the eZ80Acclaim! line. Like other eZ80 variants, it has an external address and data bus and can thus be used as a general purpose microprocessor as well.

Use in commercial products 

The latest (mid-2015) graphing calculator in the TI-84 line by Texas Instruments, the TI-84 Plus CE, uses the eZ80 in the 24-bit address mode at a clock rate of 48 MHz. In Europe, the TI-84 Plus CE-T and TI-83 Premium CE are also powered by the eZ80.

The EZ80L92 is the primary processor in the ST Robotics robot controller, clocked at 50MHz. It has 128Kb of external RAM and 128Kb of external flash memory.

References

Further reading 

 
 

Zilog microprocessors
24-bit microprocessors
8-bit microprocessors